The 1996-97 season of the FA Women's Premier League was the 6th season of the former top flight of English women's association football. nb table does not balance - it is five goals adrift (total goals scored 318-313 and goal difference confirms as five out)

National Division

Top goal scorers

References

Ilkeston Football

Eng
women
FA Women's National League seasons
1